Pt. Jawahar Lal Nehru Government Medical College and Hospital Chamba located in Chamba district was upgraded to a Medical College in 2017.

Course
Chamba Medical College undertakes the education and training of students MBBS courses.

References

Medical colleges in Himachal Pradesh
Hospitals in Himachal Pradesh
Chamba, Himachal Pradesh
Buildings and structures in Chamba district
2016 establishments in Himachal Pradesh
Educational institutions established in 2016